Boutrouch is a rural commune in Sidi Ifni Province of the Guelmim-Oued Noun region of Morocco. At the time of the 2004 census, the commune had a total population of 4496 people living in 714 households.

Villages 
 
ID ALI OU AHMED
AFRA
ANAMER
ID HMOU AADI
ID AADI OU M'BAREK
ID AHMED OU LHCEN 
ID ALI OU BLAID
ID BAHA OU SALEH 
ID BELLA OU BELLA
ID BOUBKER 
ID BOUHYA 
ID BOUZMANE
ID BRICHE
ID HAMMOU AADI 
ID HASSI 
ID KAROUM
ID LHAJ ALI
ID LHCEN OU MASSOUD
ID MBARK
ID MHMED 
ID MIMOUNE
ID MOUSSA
ID SAID OUBERKA
ID SIDI MBARK 
ID YAZZAL 
ID ZEDDOU
IMACHIOUNE
IMAOUNE
IMRZGUELLI
IZEROUALN
OUAOUGCHRIR:ASSAKA
RAGZA
TAFRAOUTE IGRA
TAGRIANTE
TANNADINE
TAOURIRT 
TIZAGHARINE
TOURGHT
TOUZOUMTE

References

Populated places in Sidi Ifni Province
Rural communes of Guelmim-Oued Noun